Rodolfo Moises Graieb (born 8 June 1974 in Río Ceballos, Córdoba) is an Argentine football defender who is without a club, he most recently played for Club Atlético Lanús in Argentina.

Graieb started his professional career in 1994 with Talleres de Córdoba. In 1997, he moved to Buenos Aires to play for Club Atlético Huracán where he stayed until 2003.

Graieb moved to Ecuador in 2003 where ha played for Barcelona Sporting Club, he returned to Argentina in 2004 to join Lanús. In 2007, he was part of the squad that won the Apertura 2007 tournament, Lanús' first ever top flight league title.

At the end of the 2008-09 season Graieb was released by Lanús.

Titles

External links
 Argentine Primera statistics
 BDFA profile

1974 births
Living people
Sportspeople from Córdoba Province, Argentina
Argentine footballers
Association football defenders
Talleres de Córdoba footballers
Club Atlético Huracán footballers
Barcelona S.C. footballers
Expatriate footballers in Ecuador
Club Atlético Lanús footballers
Argentine Primera División players
Argentine expatriate footballers